Harold John Allen (January 23, 1923 – August 2, 1990) was a Canadian ice hockey player with the Edmonton Mercurys.

Career 
Allen won a gold medal at the 1950 World Ice Hockey Championships in London, England. The 1950 Edmonton Mercurys team was inducted to the Alberta Sports Hall of Fame in 2011. Allen, the brother of Keith Allen, also played in the PCHL for the Los Angeles Monarchs and Oakland Oaks. He later coached the Edmonton Oil Kings, and was named Edmonton's Sportsman of the Year after his Oil Kings team appeared in the 1959–60 Memorial Cup. Allen died on August 2, 1990, at the age of 67.

References

1923 births
1990 deaths
Canadian ice hockey centres
Ice hockey people from Edmonton
Oakland Oaks (PCHL) players